Ælfwine of Warwick was a Sheriff of Warwickshire under William the Conquorer, and one of the few Anglo-Saxons to retain their lands after the conquest.

Family
His mother was Erminhild de Warwick and his father was Wigod de Wallingford, Earl of Wallington and a descendant of both Egbert III of England, and Charles Martel.

His wife was Horne and children were:

Turchill of Kinsbury de Warwick also known as Thorkell of Arden who was a knight and Earl of Warrckshire, who married Leverunia and through whom was the progenitor of the Arden family in Warwickshire.
Leofstan
Gudmund

His sister Ealdgyth was the wife of Robert d'Oilly, who succeeded him as Sheriff.

Estates
He was the owner of Ryton-on-Dunsmore, an estate assessed at 3½ hides and including woodland half a league by 2 furlongs, and a mill worth 12s. and a benefactor of Coventry Abbey.

References

People from Warwickshire (before 1974)
History of Warwickshire
High Sheriffs of Warwickshire
Year of birth unknown
Norman conquest of England
11th-century English people